Im Se-mi (born May 29, 1987) is a South Korean actress.

Career
In January 2019, Im signed with new agency YNK Entertainment.

On February 3, 2022, Im signed an exclusive contract with Noon Company, after her contract with YNK Entertainment has expired.

Filmography

Film

Television series

Web series

Variety show

Theater

Awards and nominations

References

External links

1987 births
Living people
South Korean television actresses
South Korean film actresses
South Korean stage actresses
Dongduk Women's University alumni